Eocarterus baeticus is a species of ground beetle in the genus Eocarterus.

References

B
Beetles described in 1837